Ognyan Toshev (born 23 June 1940) is a former Bulgarian cyclist. He competed in the individual road race and team time trial events at the 1960 Summer Olympics.

References

External links
 

1940 births
Living people
Bulgarian male cyclists
Olympic cyclists of Bulgaria
Cyclists at the 1960 Summer Olympics
Sportspeople from Sofia